Valle Catholic High School is a private, Roman Catholic high school in Sainte Genevieve, Missouri.  It is located in the Roman Catholic Archdiocese of Saint Louis.

Background
Valle Catholic was established in 1925 by the Sisters of St. Joseph.  It serves residents in Sainte Genevieve County. In 1925, Reverend C. L. Tourenhout asked the Sisters of St. Joseph to organize a high school. They granted the request and opened the school in the stone structure south of the church at DuBourg and Market Streets. It was named Valle High School after Felix and Odile Valle, benefactors to the parish. A standard four-year course of studies was adopted, and Valle was granted accreditation by the state of Missouri.

Academics
ACT scores are consistently well above of the national average. Each year, year the graduating class honors those with the highest GPA's; this includes the Top 10 and the selection of a class salutatorian and valedictorian.

Subjects include, but not limited to:
 Mathematics: Algebra, Geometry, Pre-Calculus, Trigonometry, Calculus
 Science: Biology, Chemistry, Environmental Science, Anatomy and Physiology, Physics, Psychology, Sociology
 History: Civics, Geography, World History, U.S. History, Western Civilization
 Language Arts: English, World Literature, American Literature, Modern Novels, Mass Media, Writing for Print, Spanish, French, German
 Fine and Practical Arts: Band (Marching and Concert), Art, Drama, Mechanical Drawing, Architectural Drawing, Web Design, Consumer Issues, Business Basics, Accounting, Economics
 Religion: Introduction to Catholicism, Understanding the Scriptures, Social Justice, Vocations

Notes and references

External links
 School Website

Roman Catholic Archdiocese of St. Louis
Catholic secondary schools in Missouri
Schools in Ste. Genevieve County, Missouri
Educational institutions established in 1925